Kate Leeming (born 1967) is an Australian extreme endurance cyclist and explorer, known for several long distance cycling expeditions. She has cycled more than twice round the world at the Equator.

Background
Leeming was raised in Northam, rural Western Australia, graduating from the University of Western Australia in the 1980s and qualifying as a teacher (Geography and Physical Education). She spent 12 years (1990-2002) in the UK and France, initially as a hockey player, then a fitness trainer before becoming a Real Tennis professional. During this time she cycled 15,000 km through Europe, from Spain to Turkey, and to Nordkapp, Norway.

Leeming is divorced, and currently lives in Melbourne, Australia where she a senior professional in Real Tennis at the Royal Melbourne Tennis Club.

Expeditions
Leeming undertook the 'Trans-Siberian Cycle Expedition' (with Greg Yeoman) in 1993, becoming the first woman to cycle across the new Russia unsupported, ending in Vladivostok on a bike that was suffering metal fatigue. The 13,400 km journey took 5 months and included long stretches following the Trans-Siberian railway in swampy conditions. Sponsorship was donated to support the children of Chernobyl.

The 'Great Australian Cycle Expedition' (2004/2005) was 25,000 km, largely unaided, and following a circuitous route beginning and ending in Canberra. It included the first bicycle crossing of the Canning Stock Route by a woman. The book Out There and Back (2007) documents the trip.

On August 16, 2010 she became the first person to cycle an unbroken line from Africa’s most westerly to its most easterly points; from Pointe des Almadies, Senegal to Cape Hafun, Puntland, Somalia. She cycled 22,040 km over ten months, supported by a small team for some of the journey. Crossing 20 countries in 299 days, access through the final stretch in Somalia was granted by breakaway states, including Puntland where al-Shabaab rebels threatened the convoy. Sponsorship was used to support 'Breaking the Cycle in Africa', highlighting development needs and activities of war-torn and poverty-stricken nations, particular the education of girls. A prizewinning documentary awaits wide distribution and the book Njinga documents the journey.

In June 2019, she became the first person to cycle the entire Namibian coastline, 1,621 km largely on sand, crossing extensive dune fields as well as beaches. She began at the mouth of the Kunene River on the Angolan border, and traversed the Skeleton Coast heading south and the Namib Desert to the Orange River mouth on the South African border. She used an all-wheel drive bike with a pinion drive and clutch to the front wheel and oversized tyres. The first of several of these Christini bikes was built in Philadelphia in 2013. The expedition was captured in a documentary, series, 'Diamonds In the Sand' shown on Outside TV, National Geographic Asia and CNBC.

Recent expeditions have included 'The Andes, the Altiplano & the Atacama' (2020 and 2022, from Cusco, Peru across the Bolivian Altiplano and the Argentinian Puna de Atacama), 'The Lights of Ladakh' which brought solar power to the most remote community in the Zanskar Range, the Indian Himalaya (film, 2018), along the course of the Finke River in central Australia, down the Baja Divide in Mexico and training in Svalbard, Northeast Greenland, Arctic Canada and Iceland for a proposed expedition across Antarctica.

Sport
Leeming was ranked number 2 in the world for Real Tennis, reaching the finals in women's doubles four times between 1997 and 2019. She is a former Australian women's singles champion, winning 5 titles between 1996 and 2013, and coaches the sport.

Awards
 Njinga - Action on Film International Film Festival in Los Angeles, best documentary (cinematography) and best documentary (sport), 2014. 
 Honorary Doctor of Education (2016, The University of Western Australia).

References

Living people
Ultra-distance cyclists
Australian female cyclists
Australian real tennis players
People from Northam, Western Australia
1967 births